Monshian (also Romanized as Monshīān; also known as Mīshān, Mīshūn, and Mīsūn) is a village in Baraan-e Shomali Rural District, in the Central District of Isfahan County, Isfahan Province, Iran. At the 2006 census, its population was 1,672, in 411 families.

References 

Populated places in Isfahan County